This is a list of amphibians of Great Britain. There are seven amphibian species native to Great Britain, in addition, there are a number of naturalized species. The natives comprise three newts, two toads and four frogs.

Native species

Pleurodelinae
Great crested newt (Triturus cristatus) 
Smooth newt (Lissotriton vulgaris) 
Palmate newt (Lissotriton helveticus)

Bufonidae
Common toad (Bufo bufo) 
Spiny toad (Bufo spinosus)  — Jersey 
Natterjack toad (Epidalea calamita)

Ranidae
Common frog (Rana temporaria) 
Pool frog (Pelophylax lessonae) 
Moor frog (Rana arvalis) 
Agile frog (Rana dalmatina)

Naturalised and escaped species

 Salamanders and newts
 Fire salamander (Salamandra salamandra) — has bred at least once
 Alpine newt (Ichthyosaura alpestris) (naturalised)
 Italian crested newt (Triturus carnifex)
 Toads
 Midwife toad (Alytes obstetricans) (naturalised)
 Yellow-bellied toad (Bombina variegata) — was naturalised but current status unknown.
 Frogs
 Painted frog (Discoglossus pictus) — has bred at least once
 European tree frog (Hyla arborea)
 Australian green tree frog (Litoria caerulea) — has bred at least once
 Marsh frog (Pelophylax ridibundus) (naturalised)
 Edible frog (Pelophylax kl. esculentus) (naturalised)
 Iberian water frog (Pelophylax perezi) – has bred
 American bullfrog (Lithobates catesbeiana) — successfully bred
 African clawed toad (Xenopus laevis) — two populations survived in the UK for 50 years, now extinct apart from in Calderstones Park.

References

amphibians
Great Britain
'amphibians
amphibians
Great Britain